The discography of Canadian singer Keshia Chanté consists of four studio albums, eight top ten singles, fifteen singles and ten music videos.

She has had eight Top Ten singles at radio with songs "Shook", "Unpredictable", "Bad Boy", "Does He Love Me?", "Been Gone", "2U", "Fallen" & "Table Dancer". Chanté has won many awards, including a Juno Award, "Best New Artist" at the Canadian Radio Awards and five Urban Music Awards, as well as "Video of the Year" and "Fans Choice".

After a three-year musical hiatus, in November 2010 Chante released 2 videos for 2 new singles "Table Dancer" and "Test Drive", both from her album Night & Day, which was released November 2011. Both singles were nominated for Juno Awards; R&B Recording of the Year for "Test Drive" and Dance Recording of the Year for "Table Dancer". The latter song also charted at number one on the Billboard chart in Japan, making it Chanté's first song ever to chart outside of Canada.

Albums

Studio albums

Singles

As lead artist

References

External links

 
 
Discographies of Canadian artists